Dowlai (also Romanized as Dowlā’ī and Do Lā’ī; also known as Dollā’ī) is a village in Seyyed Shahab Rural District, in the Central District of Tuyserkan County, Hamadan Province, Iran. At the 2006 census, its population was 274, in 51 families.

References 

Populated places in Tuyserkan County